Gerd Olaug Berger (29 December 1915 – 22 February 2008) was a Norwegian politician for the Centre Party.

She served as a deputy representative to the Parliament of Norway from Akershus during the term 1965–1969. In total she met during 53 days of parliamentary session.

References

1915 births
2008 deaths
Deputy members of the Storting
Centre Party (Norway) politicians
Akershus politicians
Women members of the Storting
20th-century Norwegian women politicians
20th-century Norwegian politicians